Ísafjörður (pronounced , meaning ice fjord, literally fjord of ices) is a town in the northwest of Iceland.

The oldest part of Ísafjörður with the town centre is located on a spit of sand, or eyri, in Skutulsfjörður, a fjord which meets the waters of the larger fjord Ísafjarðardjúp. With a population of about 2,600, Ísafjörður is the largest settlement in the peninsula of Vestfirðir (Westfjords) and the administration centre of the Ísafjarðarbær municipality, which includes—besides Ísafjörður—the nearby villages of Hnífsdalur, Flateyri, Suðureyri, and Þingeyri.

History

According to the Landnámabók (the book of settlement), Skutulsfjörður was first settled by Helgi Magri Hrólfsson in the 9th century. In the 16th century, the town grew as it became a trading post for foreign merchants. Witch trials were common around the same time throughout the Westfjords, and many people were banished to the nearby peninsula of Hornstrandir, now a national nature reserve. The town of Ísafjörður was granted municipal status in 1786.

The former Danish trading post Neðstikaupstaður, established in the 18th century, contains the oldest collection of timber frame houses in Iceland. These include Krambúð (1757), Faktorshús (1765), now the Danish consulate, Tjöruhúsið (1781), now a restaurant, and the site of the Westfjords Heritage Museum Turnhúsið (1784)

Geography and climate

The Westfjords are known to be the coolest area in Iceland at sea level. Ísafjörður has a tundra climate (Köppen climate classification: ET), closely bordering on either a dry-summer subarctic climate (Köppen climate classification: Dsc) or a cold-summer mediterranean climate (Köppen climate classification: Csc), depending on if you use the 0 °C isotherm or the -3 °C isotherm. The climate is characterised by cold winters and cool summers. The climate has significantly warmed in recent years due to the effects of the Atlantic Multidecadal Oscillation.

As the rest of Iceland, Ísafjörður experiences high winds and very few clear days throughout all the year.

Overview

The partly one-lane Vestfjarðagöng (Vestfirðir Tunnel), completed in 1996, leads to the towns of Flateyri and Suðureyri, and to the western parts of the Westfjords. Ísafjörður has an airport with regular flights to Reykjavík.

Fishing has been the main industry in Ísafjörður, and the town has one of the largest fisheries in Iceland. A severe decline in the fishing industry for a variety of reasons, such as fishing restrictions in the early 1980s, and a decline in the fish population, has led the inhabitants to seek work elsewhere, leading to a decline in the town's population. The harbor also serves ferries to nearby settlements as well as larger cruise ships for tourists visiting the area. The tourist industry is growing; it is a major access point to the nature reserve on the Hornstrandir Peninsula, an uninhabited wilderness area to which ferries run weekly during summer.

Despite its size, small population, and historical isolation from the rest of the country, the town has a relatively urban atmosphere. Ísafjörður has a school of music,  as well as a hospital.  The older former hospital building now accommodates a cultural center with a library and showrooms. Recently, the small town has become known in the country as a center for alternative music outside of Iceland. A yearly festival, Aldrei fór ég suður, provides a platform for local musicians and bands from around Iceland and even from overseas. A university center, Háskólasetur Vestfjarða, which acts as a distance learning center for the 7000 residents of the Westfjords, was established in March 2005.

Education
Ísafjörður is the home to the University Centre of the Westfjords. The University Centre offers four master's degree programs: Coastal & Marine Management, Icelandic language, Coastal Communities and Regional Development, and Marine Innovation. Students graduate from the University of Akureyri.

The only gymnasium located in the Westfjords, Menntaskólinn á Ísafirði, is in Ísafjörður. The students range from 16 to 20 years of age, as is traditional in Icelandic gymnasia.

Business
Major employers in the region include Arctic Fish, Hraðfrystihúsið-Gunnvör, Íslandssaga, Klofningur, Orkubú Vestfjarða and Skaginn 3X. Ísafjörður is also the base of several noteworthy start-up companies including Fossadalur and Kerecis.

Culture

The town hosts varied and widely popular events, in the realms of both culture and outdoor recreation. These events include, but are not limited to:
The Ski Week Festival
Aldrei fór ég suður music festival
Fossavatnsgangan cross country skiing competition
European Swampsoccer Championships
Act Alone – a theatre festival dedicated to the art of acting alone, monodrama, held in August every year
Westfjords Heritage Museum

Annual music festivals
Aldrei fór ég suður – Ísafjörður Rock Festival

In 2002, Ísafjörður's own Mugison (a.k.a. Örn Elías Guðmundsson) and his father organized the first Aldrei fór ég suður Music Festival as a free concert to support the burgeoning music community in Ísafjörður. The event has been established as an annual festival in mid April. The name Aldrei fór ég suður  (I never went south) is taken from a Bubbi Morthens song of the same name, and may refer to a movement among young Icelanders to establish cultural events outside Reykjavík, and draw attention back to the nation's roots in the countryside. The festival's subtitle is "rokkhátið alþýðunnar" or "rock festival for the people."

Við Djúpið Music Festival

From 2001 through 2014, the Við Djúpið Music Festival offered master classes and concerts with nationwide and worldwide known artists, such as Erling Blöndal Bengtsson, cellist and Vovka Ashkenazy, pianist as well as the Pacifica Quartet, Evan Ziporyn, clarinetist, composer, and a member of the band Bang on a Can gave a master class and concert in Ísafjörður during Við Djúpið 2007 and among performers at the 2008 festival where Pekka Kuusisto, violinist with Simon Crawford-Phillips, pianist and Håkon Austbø, pianist.

Sports
Ísafjörður is the home of Íþróttafélagið Vestri and Knattspyrnufélagið Hörður multi-sports clubs. Vestri fields departments in basketball, football, volleyball and bicycling. Its men's and women's basketball teams have played in the top-tier basketball leagues in the country while its men's volleyball team was promoted to the top-tier division in 2019.

Knattspyrnufélagið Hörður was originally a football club but has fielded other departments, most prominently in handball, track & field, skiing and Icelandic wrestling.

Other sport clubs
 Skíðafélag Ísfirðinga - Skiing
 Golfklúbbur Ísafjarðar - Golf
 Skotíþróttafélag Ísafjarðar - Shooting sports

Notable natives and residents
Ólafur Ragnar Grímsson – President of Iceland (1996–2016)
Agnes M. Sigurðardóttir – Bishop of Iceland (since 2012)

Artists
Helgi Björnsson – Musician and actor
Mugison – Musician
Árný Margrét – Musician

Athletes

Basketball
Birgir Örn Birgisson – Former Icelandic national basketball team player
Sigurður Þorsteinsson – Icelandic national basketball team player

Cycling
Arna Sigríður Albertsdóttir – para-cyclist who competed at the 2020 Summer Paralympics

Football

Stella Hjaltadóttir – former member of the Icelandic women's national football team
Björn Helgason – former member of the Icelandic men's national football team
Jón Oddsson – former member of the Icelandic men's national football team and the Icelandic track and field national team.
Emil Pálsson – caps for the Icelandic men's national football team 
Ómar Torfason – former member of the Icelandic men's national football team
Matthías Vilhjálmsson – caps for the Icelandic men's national football team

Skiing

Arnór Gunnarsson – former Olympic skier
Ásta Halldórsdóttir – former Olympic skier
Daníel Jakobsson – former Olympic skier
Steinþór Jakobsson – former Olympic skier
Guðmundur Jóhannsson – former Olympic skier
Sigurður Jónsson – former Olympic skier
Einar Valur Kristjánsson – former Olympic skier
Einar Ólafsson – former Olympic skier
Gunnar Pétursson – former Olympic skier
Oddur Pétursson – former Olympic skier
Árni Sigurðsson – former Olympic skier

References

External links

Town of Ísafjörður
Aldrei fór ég suður Rock Festival (in Icelandic and English)
More information and photos about Ísafjörður on Hit Iceland
Við Djúpið Music Festival
Fossavatn Ski Marathon (in Icelandic, English, French, German, and Norwegian)
Isafjordur Photo Collection
Háskólasetur Vestfjarða

 
Populated places in Westfjords
Populated places established in the 9th century